The Edict of Fontainebleau was issued June 1, 1540 by French King Francis I at his Palace of Fontainebleau. It occurred after the "Affair of the Placards" turned Francis I's policy from one of tolerance to persecution of Protestantism. The edict stated that the Protestant heresy was "high treason against God and mankind" and so deserved the appropriate punishments of torture, loss of property, public humiliation and death.

Thus, the Edict of Fontainebleau codified the persecution of the French Protestants, also called Huguenots, and was the first of many edicts in France to persecute them. The next major edict was the Edict of Châteaubriant, which was issued by the next king, Henry II.

Notes

References
 
 
 

1540 in Europe
1540 in law
Fontainebleau 1540
1540 in France
Huguenot history in France
Francis I of France